Blackbutt South is a rural locality in the South Burnett Region, Queensland, Australia.

History 

On 1 February 2018, Blackbutt South's postcode changed from 4306 to 4314.

References 

South Burnett Region
Localities in Queensland